The Pârâul Vinului (also: Valea Vinului) is a right tributary of the river Bistricioara in Romania. It flows into the Bistricioara in Capu Corbului.

References

Rivers of Romania
Rivers of Harghita County